James Roberts (born 29 September 1936) is a Liberian sprinter. He competed in the 100 metres at the 1956 Summer Olympics and the 1960 Summer Olympics.

References

External links
 

1936 births
Living people
Athletes (track and field) at the 1956 Summer Olympics
Athletes (track and field) at the 1960 Summer Olympics
Liberian male sprinters
Olympic athletes of Liberia
People from Montserrado County